Mickey's Dangerous Chase, known in Japan as , is a platform video game developed by Now Production for the Game Boy. It was released in North America in 1991 and Europe in 1992 by Capcom and Japan in December 1992 by Kemco; it was later re-released by Nintendo under the Player's Choice brand, making it one of the first games to be sold under the brand. It also comes with support for the Super Game Boy hardware device.

Gameplay

The player takes the role of either Mickey Mouse or his girlfriend Minnie. On the way to deliver a present, Pete came along and stole it. The gameplay is a side-scrolling action game where players destroy enemies with blocks.

There are items that grant temporary invincibility along with a 1-up and boosts to the player's health. Players have to navigate a lake, the summit of a mountain, through a vast forest, and even stroll through the shopping center while avoiding insects, small mammals, and snowballs. All of these enemies appear in their appropriate levels (i.e., no ghosts in the town level, no flying squirrels in the haunted house level.

Reception

Nintendo Power magazine gave the game a 68% in their March 1991 issue.

See also
List of Disney video games

References

1991 video games
Disney games by Capcom
Game Boy games
Game Boy-only games
Kemco games
Mickey Mouse video games
Now Production games
Platform games
Side-scrolling video games
Video games developed in Japan
Video games featuring female protagonists
Single-player video games